The Bermondsey Lion is a sculpture in The Blue, Bermondsey, London, created by Kevin Boys for Southwark Council. It was unveiled on 16 July 2011.

The plaque on the plinth of the statue states:

References

Outdoor sculptures in London
2011 sculptures
Bermondsey